Paulo de Mello Bastos (São José da Laje, May 25, 1918 — May 30, 2019) was a former leader of the , a former leader of the  and a former Varig pilot whose resignation in 1963 inspired a general strike in the country.

Biography

Childhood
Paulo de Mello Bastos was born at the Engenho do Roçadinho, in São José da Laje, on May 25, 1918, son of Sebastião Marques de Mello Bastos, founder and former mayor of Panelas and Honorinha Portela Bastos.

Education
Paulo de Mello Bastos studied at Americano Baptista (Recife), Diocesano College (Maceió), Alagoano Lyceum (Alagoas) and at Quinze de Novembro de Garanhuns (Pernambuco).

Career

Air Force
In 1938 he was among those enrolled in the Administration Course for Naval Air Reserve officers by decision of the Navy Minister.

On April 6, 1940, Paulo de Mello received his naval aviator pilot's license, graduating as the first in his class. In the same year he tried to volunteer for the Royal Air Force to fight against Germany during WWII, but it was not possible because Brazil had not yet entered the war at that time. In 1941 he was promoted to the rank of 2nd Lieutenant. In March of the same year he was transferred to the Aeronautics School. In April he had been assigned as an instructor at the School of Aeronautics.

On 12 January 1943 he was promoted by to the rank of First Lieutenant. In this period, already during World War II, he participated in the creation of the Aeronautics Club, a place where officers would hold political discussions, leisure, and culture. He fought in Europe during World War II against Nazism, and was decorated for his service. In 1945 he was promoted to the rank of Air Captain due to his time in service. In 1946 he applied for discharge from military service to work in the civilian sector. However, his application was only filed in 1954.

In the 1940s he was part of a committee that sought to inspire Getúlio Vargas to run for president in 1950 and to establish Petrobras, a company whose creation he had been defending for some years as a member of the nationalist side of the Armed Forces. In 1950 he was promoted to the rank of Major by "merit principle". In the same year he worked at the Directorate of Education of the Air Force. In December 1951 he received a bronze medal for more than ten years of active service.

In February 1952 he had his name proposed as part of the re-election of the  board of directors. The following year he was promoted to the rank of Lieutenant Colonell and transferred to the paid reserve.

Civilian aviation
In 1954 he joined Varig. The following year he petitioned the Supreme Federal Court for habeas corpus for former minister , who was being charged with a crime of defamation, claiming that the crime was not military in nature, and was refused on May 6, 1955, for not being the correct person to make the request. In December 1955 he even submitted his resignation from his position as President of the Pilots' Union, but was turned down for lack of the legal number present for consideration.

In 1956 he was a member of the commission that held the commemorations of the fiftieth anniversary of Alberto Santos Dumont's flight in the 14-bis. In March 1957 he advocated, with the pilots' category, the reduction from 12 to 10 daily working hours, as a way to avoid fatigue. In May of the same year he was one of the union leaders that addressed a letter to the Ministry of Aeronautics in defense of airline safety, after thirteen accidents occurred in a 20-day period. On May 31 he was elected president of the governing board of the National Union of Aeronauts, which was in power until the election of the board. At the same meeting it was decided to merge the National Union of Air Transport Pilots with the National Union of Aeronauts. In 1959, already a Varig airline captain, Paulo de Mello Bastos defended the creation of Aerobrás.

In July 1961 he was one of the union leaders who greeted cosmonaut Yuri Gagarin on his visit to Brazil. In the same period he chaired a delegation of trade unionists that visited the Soviet Union. In November of the same year he represented the pilot class in an inquiry into the crash of a VASP airplane, which collided with a tourist plane, resulting in 26 deaths. During his time at Varig, he also turned down several promotion proposals, which were aimed, according to Bastos, at controlling his union activities.

Mello Bastos strike
On May 21 he was chosen as vice-president of the CGT and in the next day he was elected as secretary of the General Workers Command. On the 25th, despite having union immunity, he was illegally fired from Varig, something that worried then president João Goulart, who tried to intercede on behalf of Paulo de Mello, and the fact that he was not reinstated, started a general strike with road workers, airline workers, oil tankers, among others, which became known as the "Mello Bastos strike", an act that the newspaper "Novos Rumos" considered unprecedented within the union movement in Brazil until then and which was reported internationally, such as in the Colombian newspaper "El Tiempo" and in the Costa Rican La Nación.

In a note, Varig reported that the dismissal would have occurred due to the captain's "serious fault", which would justify the end of the contract and later declared that only the Judiciary could decide on the case.

With the reinstatement, Varig's president, Ruben Berta, stepped down from his position. In July 1963 he received Cr$ 437,127 in unpaid wages, but refused the proposal to terminate his contract with the company and receive compensation of approximately Cr$ 7 million, which he considered offensive to him. He was barred by the company from resuming his position as an Aircraft Commander.

In June, during the events of the strike, Paulo de Mello was one of the signers of the manifesto delivered to João Goulart in which they defended, among other demands, the "firm disposition of the workers to fight alongside the president of the Republic, if necessary, in the case of a break with the International Monetary Fund".

Post-Strike

In August 1963 he took part in demonstrations to pressure the government to create Aerobrás.

However, with the indirect elections of 1964, the 1965 elections were cancelled.

In February an indictment was filed under the National Security Law that involved his name alongside other leaders for having launched a manifesto preceding the October 15, 1962 general strike. In the same period he was involved in the organization of a support coalition so that the government would be able to approve the base reforms. On March 27, 1964, he was one of the leaders involved in resolving the Sailors' revolt.

1964 coup d'état
In the events of March 31, 1964, Paulo de Mello Bastos managed to escape from prison when troops invaded the building where he was meeting with a group of union members. However, he only managed to leave the country on June 19 in a Uruguayan Air Force plane, going to Montevideo, after receiving his safe conduct to leave the country.

Officially he was declared dead and his wife received a widow's pension. In Uruguay he tried to get a job at PLUNA, but was barred due to pressure from the Brazilian government against political exiles and in the country also worked in the wine trade. In 1965 he was one of the 83 people who had to return the Santos-Dumont Merit Medal by order of President Castelo Branco and in the same year was the target of an investigation that pointed him out as a member of a "counter-revolution" articulated by Leonel Brizola.

Paulo de Mello only received the safe conduct from Itamaraty in 1966 and returned to the country in October 1967. In the same month that he returned to the country, he was arrested by DOPS for questioning, and released soon after. In 1968 he started working for the newspaper "Correio da Manhã", which had become part of the opposition to the military dictatorship.

 described that Paulo de Mello never accepted the dictatorship implanted in 1964. By dictatorship decree, he could not return to being a pilot and worked as a taxi-driver in Rio de Janeiro. Was amnestied by the Air Force in February 1980 and in 1981 tried to return to his job at Varig through the Amnesty Law. But in practice, Amnesty had only returned his political rights.

Return to the democratic period

From 1991 on, he had a hard time to get his amnesty retirement, which was only solved after an injunction from the Federal Court. In this period, during the government of Leonel Brizola in Rio de Janeiro, he accepted to be the director of the State Foundation for Education of the Minor, at the Santos Dumont School, where he tried to remove the repressive methods and give education to orphaned, street or delinquent girls. In 1998 he began his writing career, with his first book, "Salvo Conduto" (Safe Conduct), published by Garamond, describing his career as a union leader and on the same occasion received the "Destaque Aeronauta" award, from the National Union of Aeronauts. In August 1999 he released the book "Nos Bastidores da Anistia" (Behind the Scenes of Amnesty).

On October 23, 2003, he was restored the Santos-Dumont Merit Medal. In July 2011 he was involved in honoring the centennial of Brigadier Francisco Teixeira, who in 1948 launched  campaign. In 2014 he was one of the CGT representatives still alive who signed a document sent to the Ministry of Labor that requested a survey of interventions in trade union centrals between 1946 and 1988.

Death

Personal life
He married teacher Edelena Albernaz de Mello Bastos on January 23, 1943. He fathered João W. Nery, Flávia Cavalcanti and Tania de Mello Bastos. He was a cousin-brother of Luiz Portela de Carvalho, mayor of Palmares. In his career as an aviator he has accumulated more than 16,000 flight hours.

Works

References

Notes

Bibliography

(Chronological order)

External links

Busca pela Caixa Preta (short-documentary)

1918 births
2019 deaths
Brazilian military personnel of World War II
Varig
Refugees
Brazilian Air Force personnel
Brazilian centenarians
Brazilian trade unionists
Men centenarians
People from Alagoas
21st-century Brazilian writers